Marcus Udall Bell (born July 19, 1977) is a former professional American football player who played linebacker for three seasons for the Seattle Seahawks of the National Football League (NFL). Bell was drafted by the Seahawks in the fourth round of the 2000 NFL Draft (116th). Bell also played one year for the Houston Texans.

Playing size
 , 
 40 yard dash: 4.6 sec, 20 yard dash: 2.75 sec, 10 yard dash: 1.67 sec.
 225 lb bench reps: 21
 Vertical Jump: 
 Broad Jump: 
 20 yard shuttle: 4.33 sec
 3-cone drill: 7.17 sec.
Source:

Coaches' comments
 "He (Bell) was the best inside linebacker I have ever coached." University of Arizona Coach Dick Tomey
 UofA Defensive Coordinator Rich Ellerson stated: "there's not a harder worker than Marcus".
 Bell's High School coach Mike Morgan recently said "There was not a harder working player, studying film and putting time in to be a great player."

Awards and notes
 1998 All-Pac-10 Defensive team 
 Anchored the 1998 team that went 12-1 and was ranked 4th in the nation.
 Bell led the Pac-10 his senior year in tackles per game (TPG) with 10.3.
 Bell posted a Pac-10 leading 124 total tackles his senior year in 1999.
 His 139 tackles in 1998 led the nation and he was UA's leader his final two seasons.
 He finished with 405 career tackles, No. 5 on UA's all-time chart.
 Bell was a member of the UofA Dick Tomey's fearsome 1998 defense that recorded a school record 46 sacks in 1998.
 Bell was 3-1 vs. ASU
 One of 11 semi-finalists for the Butkus Award. The award is presented annually to the best linebacker in college football. This list of 11 semi-finalists was determined by balloting done by the 28-member Butkus Award Selection Committee, who made their selections from the initial Butkus Award Watch List of 66 college linebackers.
 In high school Bell never lost a game. His team, the St. Johns Redskins, went 44-0 and were undefeated for 3 years, winning 3 state championships.
 Bell won a state wrestling title his senior year.

Great games
 Bell anchored the U of A defense and held the mighty Nebraska running attack to under 100 yards rushing in the 1998 Holiday Bowl, UofA won 23-20.
 Bell recorded nation high 21 tackles in one game at Washington as a junior.
 Bell and the UA defense held USC to minus-20 yards rushing in its 31-24 win over the Trojans in 1999, Bell had a team-high nine tackles and an interception in the game.
 Against ASU in 1999, Wildcat linebacker Marcus Bell recovered a fumble giving possession to Arizona, they scored, and won the game.

References

External links

NFL.com bio

1977 births
Living people
People from St. Johns, Arizona
Players of American football from Arizona
American football linebackers
Arizona Wildcats football players
Seattle Seahawks players
Houston Texans players